The Men's 56 kg powerlifting event at the 2004 Summer Paralympics was competed  on 22 September. It was won by Wang Jian, representing .

Final round

22 Sept. 2004, 13:45

References

M